A destructive EF2 tornado hit Billings, Montana on Sunday, June 20, 2010 (Father's Day). Known as the 2010 Father's Day tornado, the strong tornado was on the ground for about 12 minutes and took the roof off the Rimrock Auto Arena at MetraPark, a 10,000 seat arena, and heavily damaged numerous businesses. The storm was accompanied by high winds and a major hail storm that caused severe damage and flash flooding in the Heights section of the city. It was the first time since 1958 that a significant tornado struck the Downtown Billings area.

Synopsis and tornado event
An unsettled pattern continued across a large part of the US, with widespread isolated tornadoes across various parts of the Plains states. The most notable tornado touched down in Billings, Montana at the MetraPark trade facility. Damage was significant, including a large section of the roof being removed at the Rimrock Auto Arena at MetraPark.

The Storm Prediction Center in Norman, Oklahoma had issued a severe thunderstorm watch for south-central Montana, including Yellowstone County, at 1:55 pm CDT on June 20, in anticipation of active severe weather throughout the region. Strong southwesterly flow aloft combined with a moderately unstable air mass created conditions favorable for producing severe thunderstorms, and potentially tornadoes.

A supercell thunderstorm moved through the Billings area in the late afternoon. At approximately 4:24 pm MDT, a tornado touched down near the intersection of Lake Elmo drive and Main Street. It damaged several buildings, including tearing roofs off of multiple structures. It also downed several power poles and billboards, and uprooted multiple trees. The tornado moved south, where it struck the Rimrock Auto Arena at MetraPark, tearing off a large portion of the roof and doing nearly $27 million worth of damage to the arena. The tornado lofted debris and deposited it as far as one mile from the damage path. After approximately 12 minutes on the ground, the tornado dissipated over the arena. The storm then moved northeast, producing numerous funnel clouds, but no further touchdowns.

Aftermath
It was the strongest tornado to strike the Billings area in over 50 years. Despite the major damage in the urban area, only some minor injuries were reported.

See also
List of North American tornadoes and tornado outbreaks

References

Billings tornado
Billings, Montana
Natural disasters in Montana
Billings
2010 in Montana
Billings tornado
Tornadoes in Montana